The Chaldean Catholic Archeparchy (or Archdiocese) of Baghdad is the Metropolitan, proper Archeparchy of the Chaldean Catholic Patriarch of  Babylon, with cathedral see in the Iraqi capital Baghdad.

As the Patriarch is its Metropolitan Archeparch, it has no other Ordinary of its own.

History 
It was established on 20 April 1553 as the Metropolitan Archdiocese of Baghdad (Latin Babylonen[sis] Chaldæorum) of the Chaldean Catholic Church, an Eastern Catholic Church using the Syro-Oriental Rite in the Chaldean language.

On 17 January 1954, it lost territory to establish the Chaldean Catholic Archdiocese of Bassorah (Archeparchy of Basra), in southern Iraq.

Auxiliary bishops 
Former Auxiliary eparchs of Baghdad :
 Auxiliary Bishop: Archbishop Yousef Ghanima (1938 – 1947.09.17), later Patriarch of Babylon
 Auxiliary Bishop: Archbishop Thomas Michel Bidawid (1970.08.24 – 1971.03.29), Titular Archbishop of Nisibis of the Chaldeans (1970.08.24 – 1971.03.29); previously Archeparch of Ahvaz of the Chaldeans (Iran) (1966.01.06 – 1970.08.24)

See also 
Catholic Church in Iran
Chaldean Catholic Church

References

External links 
 GigaCatholic with incumbent biography links

1553 establishments in Asia
Chaldean Catholic dioceses